The 14th Congress of Deputies is the current meeting of the Congress of Deputies, the lower house of the Spanish Cortes Generales, with the membership determined by the results of the general election held on 10 November 2019. The congress met for the first time on 3 December 2019. According to the Constitution of Spain the maximum legislative term of the congress is 4 years from the preceding election.

Election
The 14th Spanish general election under the 1978 Constitution was held on 10 November 2019. It saw the Spanish Socialist Workers' Party (PSOE) remaining the largest party in the Congress of Deputies, but falling short of a majority.

History
The new congress met for the first time on 3 December 2019 and after two rounds of voting Meritxell Batet (PSOE) was elected as President of the Congress of Deputies with the support of the Unidos Podemos–En Comú Podem (UP–ECP) and various nationalist and regionalist parties.

Other members of the Bureau of the Congress of Deputies were also elected on 21 May 2019: Alfonso Rodríguez (PSOE), First Vice-President; Ana Pastor (PP), Second Vice-President; Gloria Elizo (UP), Third Vice-President; Ignacio Gil (Vox), Fourth Vice-President; Gerardo Pisarello (ECP), First Secretary; Sofía Hernanz (PSOE), Second Secretary; Javier Sánchez (UP), Third Secretary; and Adolfo Suárez (PP), Fourth Secretary.

Government

Shortly after the election the PSOE and UP–ECP agreed to form a coalition government, the first in Spain since the restoration of democracy. Caretaker Prime Minister Pedro Sánchez (POSE) was re-elected narrowly in January 2020 with the support of the UP–ECP and various nationalist and regionalist parties.

Deaths, resignations and expulsions
The 14th congress has seen the following deaths, resignations and expulsions:
 13 January 2020 – Beatriz Corredor (PSOE) resigned for personal reasons. She was replaced by Isaura Leal (PSOE) on 4 February 2020.
 15 January 2020 – Dolores Delgado (PSOE) resigned after being appointed Attorney General of Spain. She was replaced by Omar Anguita (PSOE) on 4 February 2020.
 21 January 2020 – Héctor Illueca (UP) and Francisco Salazar (PSOE) resigned after being appointed Director of the Labour Inspesctorate and deputy chief of staff of the government respectively. They were replaced by Rosa Medel (UP) and José Losada (PSOE) respectively on 4 February 2020.
 22 January 2020 – Elena Máñez (PSOE) resigned after being appointed Minister of Economy, Research and Employment of the Canary Islands. She was replaced by Juan Fuentes (PSOE) on 4 February 2020.
 27 January 2020 – Francisco Polo (PSOE) resigned after being appointed High Commissioner for a Entrepreneurial Nation. He was replaced by Sonia Guerra (PSOE) on 4 February 2020.
 29 January 2020 – José Guirao (PSOE) resigned to return to cultural management and María Rosell (UP) resigned after being appointed government delegate against gender violence. They were replaced by Indalecio Gutiérrez (PSOE) and Meri Pita (UP) respectively on 4 February 2020.
 11 February 2020 – José Manuel Franco (PSOE), José Javier Izquierdo (PSOE) and María Marrodán (PSOE) resigned after being appointed government delegates in the Community of Madrid, Castile and León and La Rioja respectively. They were replaced by Rafael Vélez (PSOE), Julio del Valle (PSOE) and Raquel Pedraja (PSOE) respectively.
 21 February 2020 - Isabel Celaá, Fernando Grande-Marlaska, Reyes Maroto, José Montilla Martos, Luis Planas, Teresa Ribera, Margarita Robles, Juan Carlos Campo, Pedro Saura (PSOE) resigned as Deputies to focus on their minister or junior minister positions. They were replaced by Daniel Senderos, Gemma Araujo, Gema López, Inmaculada Oria, Antonio Hurtado Zurera, Julio Navalpotro, Manuel Arribas, José Ramón Ortega and Carmen Baños respectively.
 13 March 2020 - Pablo Arangüena and Marina Ortega (PSOE) resigned to run in the 2020 Galician regional election. They were replaced by Diego Taibo and Uxía Tizón respectively.
 21 May 2020 - Marcos de Quinto (Cs) resigned. He was replaced by Miguel Ángel Gutiérrez.
 15 July 2020 - Isabel García Tejerina (PP) resigned. She was replaced by Gabriel Elorriaga.
 12 November 2020 - Carlos Fernández-Roca (Vox) resigned. He was replaced by Mercedes Jara.
 31 January 2021 - María Pilar Ramallo (PP) resigned to focus in her job as mayor of Marín, Pontevedra. She was replaced by Juan Manuel Constenla.
 4 March 2021 - Jaume Alonso-Cuevillas (JxCat) resigned after being elected to the Parliament of Catalonia in the 2021 Catalan regional election. He was replaced by Josep Pagès.
 11 March 2021 - Laura Borràs (JxCat) and Ignacio Garriga (Vox) resigned after being elected to the Parliament of Catalonia in the 2021 Catalan regional election. They were replaced by Pilar Calvo and Juan Carlos Segura respectively.
 26 March 2021 - Pablo Iglesias Turrión (UP) resigned in order to run for President of the Community of Madrid in the 2021 Madrilenian regional election, he was replaced by Mercedes Pérez Merino. Marta Martín Llaguno (Cs) resigned, she was replaced by Juan Ignacio López-Bas.
4 May 2021 - Joan Josep Nuet (ERC) was expelled following a debarment procedure from the Supreme Court of Spain. He was replaced by Gerard Álvarez i García.
8 June 2021 - María Márquez Guerrero (UP) resigned and was replaced by Miguel Ángel Bustamante Martín.
27 July 2021 - Pilar Cancela Rodríguez (PSOE) resigned after being named secretary of State of International Cooperation. She was replaced by Natividad González Laso.
5 October 2021 - Noelia Vera (UP) resigned and retired from politics, and was replaced by Juan Antonio Delgado Ramos.
22 October 2021 - Alberto Rodríguez (UP) was expelled following a debarment procedure from the Supreme Court of Spain. No other UP candidate took his seat, remaining vacant in protest for the ruling.
30 November 2021 - Teresa Jiménez-Becerril (PP) resigned when appointed associate to the Spanish Ombudsman. She was replaced by Ricardo Tarno.
28 March 2022 - Manuel Gabriel González Ramos (PSOE) resigned when appointed to the board of directors of Enagás. He was replaced by José Carlos Díaz Rodríguez.
4 April 2022 - Pablo Casado (PP), leader of the opposition, resigned after a party rebellion against him. He was replaced by Percival Manglano.
21 April 2022 - Pablo Montesinos (PP) resigned in solidarity with former party leader Pablo Casado. He was replaced by Ángel Luis González Muñoz.
27 June 2022 - Macarena Olona (Vox) and Juan Antonio Delgado Ramos (UP) resigned after being elected to the Parliament of Andalusia in the 2022 Andalusian regional election. They were replaced by Onofre Miralles and José Luis Bueno Pinto respectively.
30 June 2022 - Pedro Quevedo (NC) resigned. He was replaced by María Fernández Pérez.

Members

See also
 14th Cortes Generales
 14th Senate of Spain

Notes

References
 
 

2019 establishments in Spain
Congress of Deputies (Spain)
 
Spain
Congress of Deputies of Spain